The term microlecture is not used here to refer to microcontent for microlearning, but to actual instructional content that is formatted for online and mobile learning using a constructivist approach. More specifically, as described in the Chronicle of Higher Education, these are approximately 60 second presentations with a specific structure. They are not just brief (one minute) presentations: although Dr. McGrew had success with "one minute lectures" at the University of Northern Iowa as did Dr. Kee at the University of Leeds.

David M. Penrose (aka the One Minute Professor), an independent instructional designer and eLearning consultant, has articulated the process for creating these microlectures. As stated (Shea, 2009), these specific lectures are combined with specific activities designed to promote the epistemic engagement of the learner. The response of the Higher Education community was mixed, with some positive and some negative.

The interest surrounding the use of microlectures has continued to grow, even outside of the United States, to places like Hong Kong University, Yantai Nanshai University, Liaoning Police Academy, and East China Normal University.  In the United States, the use of microlectures are even considered a vital part of the Pandemic Response Plans. Additionally, even scholars at schools like Princeton University (Humanities Resource Center), UNC's School of Government, Humboldt State University, University of West Florida, and University of Illinois Urbana-Champaign support the importance of an innovative teaching-learning approach for learners in the 21st century.

The popularity of the microlectures has been the focus of a recent (November 1, 2012) EDUCAUSE resource, the Educause Learning Initiative "7 Things You Should Know About" series. The EDUCAUSE series is published monthly and dates back to May 1, 2005. In each issue, the focus addresses seven basic questions ...

What is it?
How does it work?
Who's doing it?
Why is it significant?
What are the downsides?
Where is it going?
What are the implications for higher education?

It is appropriate to include a quote by Xueqin Lu of Wuhan Textile University (2015) "... we can conclude micro-lectures focus on delivery of topics, show cutting-edge updating of knowledge and provide insight, vision and careful management for students.".

See also 
 Instructional design
 Microcontent
 Microlearning
 Online learning

References 

Teaching
Educational technology